Donald Boyd Odegard (born November 22, 1966) is a former American football cornerback in the National Football League.

Career
Odegard played college football at Oregon State University and later at UNLV, and was selected in the 6th round (150th overall) by the Cincinnati Bengals in the 1990 NFL Draft.  He was waived in preseason, and was picked up by the New York Jets.  He played in 14 games for the Jets in the 1990 season, and another 16 for them in 1991.

External links
Don Odegard stats
New York Jets bio

1966 births
Living people
Players of American football from Seattle
American football quarterbacks
Hamilton Tiger-Cats players
Memphis Mad Dogs players
Oregon State Beavers football players
Toronto Argonauts players
UNLV Rebels football players
New York Jets players